A. Nanjil Murugesan is an Indian politician and ex member of the Tamil Nadu Legislative Assembly from the Nagercoil constituency from 2011-16. He represents the Anna Dravida Munnetra Kazhagam party. He was expelled from  AIADMK  for anti-party activities on 27th of July, 2020.

References 

People from Kanyakumari district
Members of the Tamil Nadu Legislative Assembly
All India Anna Dravida Munnetra Kazhagam politicians
Living people
Year of birth missing (living people)